The Price of the Ticket is a collection of James Baldwin's writing that was published in 1985. It is a collection of essays spanning the years from 1948 to 1985. These are Baldwin's commentaries on race in America.

James Baldwin: The Price of the Ticket is a 1989 biographical film by director Karen Thorsen.

List of essays
Introduction: The Price of the Ticket
The Harlem Ghetto
Lockridge: "The American Myth"
Journey to Atlanta
Everybody's Protest Novel
Encounter on the Seine: Black Meets Brown
Princes and Powers
Many Thousands Gone
Stranger in the Village
A Question of Identity
The Male Prison
Carmen Jones: The Dark Is Light Enough
Equal in Paris
Notes of a Native Son
Faulkner and Desegregation
The Crusade of Indignation
A Fly in Buttermilk
The Discovery of What It Means to Be an American
On Catfish Row
Nobody Knows My Name
The Northern Protestant
Fifth Avenue, Uptown
They Can't Turn Back
In Search of a Majority
Notes for a Hypothetical Novel
The Dangerous Road Before Martin Luther King
East River, Downtown
Alas, Poor Richard
The Black Boy Looks at the White Boy
The New Lost Generation
The Creative Process
Color
A Talk to Teachers
The Fire Next Time
Nothing Personal
Words of a Native Son
The American Dream and the American Negro
White Man's Guilt
A Report from Occupied Territory
Negroes Are Anti-Semitic Because They're Anti-White
White Racism or World Community?
Sweet Lorraine
No Name in the Street
A Review Of Roots
The Devil Finds Work
An Open Letter to Mr. Carter
Every Good-Bye Ain't Gone
If Black English Isn't a Language, Then Tell Me, What Is?
An Open Letter to the Born Again
Dark Days
Notes on the House of Bondage
Here Be Dragons

Notes

References

External links
Excerpts at Google Books

1985 non-fiction books
Essay collections by James Baldwin
Books about race and ethnicity